Milladore is a village in Wood County and overlapping into  Portage County in the U.S. state of Wisconsin. The population was 276 at the 2010 census. Most of the village is located within the Town of Milladore in Wood County, while only a very small portion of the village lies in Portage County. All of its 2010 census population resided in the Wood County portion of the village.

History
Milladore was platted in 1877. According to one tradition, an early postmaster selected the name from his reading material, while another tradition states the village was named after a train car. A post office called Milladore has been in operation since 1875.

Geography
Milladore is located at  (44.604282, -89.852281).

Demographics

2010 census
As of the census of 2010, there were 276 people, 106 households, and 73 families living in the village. The racial makeup of the village was 93.1% White, 1.1% African American, 5.1% from other races, and 0.7% from two or more races. Hispanic or Latino of any race were 6.9% of the population.

There were 106 households, of which 35.8% had children under the age of 18 living with them, 60.4% were married couples living together, 4.7% had a female householder with no husband present, 3.8% had a male householder with no wife present, and 31.1% were non-families. 27.4% of all households were made up of individuals, and 10.4% had someone living alone who was 65 years of age or older. The average household size was 2.60 and the average family size was 3.21.

The median age in the village was 35 years. 26.1% of residents were under the age of 18; 8.7% were between the ages of 18 and 24; 26% were from 25 to 44; 27.9% were from 45 to 64; and 11.2% were 65 years of age or older. The gender makeup of the village was 54.0% male and 46.0% female.

2000 census
At the 2000 census, there were 268 people, 102 households and 70 families living in the village. The population density was 267.6 per square mile (103.5/km2). There were 108 housing units at an average density of 107.9 per square mile (41.7/km2). The racial makeup of the village was 98.88% White, 0.37% Native American (one person), and 0.75% (two people) from two or more races.

There were 102 households, of which 29.4% had children under the age of 18 living with them, 56.9% were married couples living together, 6.9% had a female householder with no husband present, and 30.4% were non-families. 23.5% of all households were made up of individuals, and 11.8% had someone living alone who was 65 years of age or older. The average household size was 2.63 and the average family size was 3.13.

22.8% of the population were under the age of 18, 14.2% from 18 to 24, 27.2% from 25 to 44, 19.4% from 45 to 64, and 16.4% who were 65 years of age or older. The median age was 36 years. For every 100 females, there were 114.4 males. For every 100 females age 18 and over, there were 113.4 males.

The median household income was $46,458 and the median family income was $56,500. Males had a median income of $34,750 versus $16,786 for females. The per capita income for the village was $19,235. About 1.5% of families and 4.1% of the population were below the poverty line, including 6.8% of those under the age of eighteen and 7.9% of those 65 or over.

Notable people
Amy Sue Vruwink, politician

Images

References

External links
 1909 plat map of Milladore
 1928 plat map

Villages in Wood County, Wisconsin
Villages in Wisconsin
Villages in Portage County, Wisconsin